is a railway station in the city of Ashikaga, Tochigi Prefecture, Japan, operated by the East Japan Railway Company (JR East).

Lines
Ashikaga Station is served by the Ryōmō Line, and is located 38.2 km from the terminus of the line at Oyama Station.

Station layout
Ashikaga Station has two opposed side platforms connected to the station building by a footbridge. The station is staffed.

Platforms

History
Ashikaga Station opened on 22 May 1888, as a station operated by the Ryomo Railway. With the privatization of Japanese National Railways (JNR) on 1 April 1987, the station came under the control of JR East.

Passenger statistics
In fiscal 2017, the station was used by an average of 3158 passengers daily (boarding passengers only).

Surrounding area

Ashikagashi Station (Tobu Isesaki Line)
Ashikaga Gakkō
Orihime Shrine 
Banna-ji temple
 
Ashikaga City Hall
Ashikaga Central Post Office
Watarase River

See also
 List of railway stations in Japan

References

External links

 JR East Station information 

Railway stations in Tochigi Prefecture
Ryōmō Line
Stations of East Japan Railway Company
Railway stations in Japan opened in 1888
Ashikaga, Tochigi